The John W. McCormack Graduate School of Policy Studies at UMass Boston was founded in 2003 and grew out of the John W. McCormack Institute for Public Affairs which opened in 1983. In 2010, the school expanded its mission and name. The McCormack Graduate School also provides editorial management of the New England Journal of Public Policy and two peer-reviewed academic journals, the Journal of Aging and Social Policy and Research on Aging.

Graduate degree and Certificate programs

 Conflict resolution (Graduate certificates, MA degree) 
 Gerontology (Graduate certificates, MS and PhD degrees) 
 Global Governance and Human Security (PhD degree) 
 International Relations (MSPA degree) 
 Public Affairs (MSPA degree) 
 Public Policy (PhD degree) 
 Women in Politics and Public Policy (Graduate certificate)

Centers, Institutes, and Special projects

 Center for Community Democracy and Democratic Literacy 
 Center for Governance and Sustainability 
 Center for Peace, Democracy, and Development 
 Center for Rebuilding Sustainable Communities after Disasters 
 Center for Social and Demographic Research on Aging 
 Center for Social Policy 
 Center for Women in Politics and Public Policy 
 Center on Media and Society 
 Collaborative Institute for Oceans, Climate, and Security 
 Commonwealth Compact, a Massachusetts workforce diversity initiative 
 Edward J. Collins, Jr. Center for Public Management 
 Gerontology Institute 
 John Joseph Moakley Chair for Peace and Reconciliation 
 Osher Lifelong Learning Institute
 Pension Action Center
 The Democracy Lab at UMass Boston

The school is named in honor of U.S. House of Representatives Speaker John W. McCormack.

External links
 Official website
 Journal of Aging and Social Policy and Research on Aging
 New England Journal of Public Policy

University of Massachusetts Boston
University of Massachusetts
Columbia Point, Boston